Fængslende feriedage is a 1978 Danish family film directed by Finn Henriksen and starring Jørgen Ryg. It was also Dirch Passer's final film.

Cast
Jørgen Ryg as Henry Villand Møller
Lisbet Dahl as Agnete Møller
Birgitte Federspiel as Cornelia Møller
Dirch Passer as Fængselsinspektør Frost
Preben Kaas as Galleriejer Toft
Arthur Jensen as Klausen
Ole Ernst as Tam
Bjørn Puggaard-Müller as Arrestforvalter Fritjofsen
Elin Reimer as Rikke Fritjofsen
Gyrd Løfquist as Amtsvandindspektør
Torben Jensen as Narkobetjent Cartsen
Ulf Pilgaard as Læge
Bjørn Ploug as Carlsen
Poul Thomsen as Politiassistent
Jan Hertz as Betjent

References

External links

1978 films
Danish children's films
1970s Danish-language films
Films directed by Finn Henriksen